WLKF (1430 AM) is a commercial radio station licensed to Lakeland, Florida, and serving Central Florida.  It broadcasts a talk radio format and is owned by Hall Communications, Inc.

By day, WLKF transmits with 5,000 watts, but to avoid interference with other stations on 1430 AM, at night it reduces power to 1,000 watts.  It uses a non-directional antenna at all times.  Programming is also heard on FM translator W244BJ at 96.7 MHz in Lakeland.

Programming
Weekdays on WLKF begin with a local news and information show, "Mayhem in the A.M."  It is hosted by Len Erickson and Tolanda Yates.  The rest of the weekday schedule is made up of nationally syndicated conservative talk shows:  Brian Kilmeade, Dan Bongino, Sean Hannity, Dave Ramsey, Eric Metaxas, Mike Gallagher, "America in the Morning" and "Coast to Coast AM with George Noory."

Weekends feature shows on money, health, Christian programming, real estate, gardening, food, technology, pets, car repair and travel.  Weekend hosts include Kim Komando.  Most hours begin with world and national news from ABC News Radio.

History
On , the station first signed on as WLAK.  It was an NBC Red Network affiliate.  It stayed with NBC throughout the 1960s.  The call letters were changed to WQPD on December 1, 1971. The call letters were changed to the current WLKF in the early 1980s. It began airing an adult contemporary format. The format lasted until 1987 when it switched to its current Talk Radio format.

References

External links

LKF
Radio stations established in 1958
1958 establishments in Florida